is the tenth studio album by Japanese entertainer Miho Nakayama. Released through King Records on December 5, 1989, it is a Christmas-themed album, featuring five song covers, two original songs written by Nakayama (under the pseudonym "Mizuho Kitayama"), and an instrumental version of her 1988 song "Long Distance to the Heaven". It is also the first album that Nakayama produced herself. A limited edition release included a 20-page hardcover storybook adaptation of "Long Distance to the Heaven".

The album peaked at No. 9 on Oricon's albums chart and sold over 110,000 copies.

Track listing 
All music is arranged by Kazuo Ōtani.

Charts

References

External links
 
 
 

1989 Christmas albums
Miho Nakayama albums
English-language Japanese albums
Japanese-language albums
Christmas albums by Japanese artists
King Records (Japan) albums